is a Japanese shōnen manga magazine published by Fujimi Shobo. The magazine began as a combination between Monthly Comic Dragon and Monthly Dragon Junior, two former magazines published by Fujimi Shobo. The first issue was published in April 2003, and the magazine is sold on the ninth of each month. The magazine carries the title "New Age Standard Comic". A special edition version called Dragon Age Pure was active between January 2006 and February 2009.

Serialized manga

A-kun (17) no Sensō
Amagi Brilliant Park
Ange Vierge Linkage
Armored Core: Tower City Blade
Black Blood Brothers
BlazBlue
Blaze
Bremen
Chrome Shelled Regios Missing Mail
Chrono Crusade
Croisée in a Foreign Labyrinth
Date A Live
Death March to the Parallel World Rhapsody
Demon Heart
Demonizer Zilch
Densetsu no Yūsha no Densetsu
Densha Gakuen Mohamohagumi
Devel 17 Hōkago no Kyōsenshi
Diebuster
Dolls Fall
Dorotea: Majo no Kanazuchi
Dragons Rioting
D.Y.N. Freaks
Full Metal Panic! Σ
Galaxy Angel
Goshūshō-sama Ninomiya-kun
Gosick
Gun-Ota ga Mahou Sekai ni Tensei shitara, Gendai Heiki de Guntai Harem wo Tsukucchaimashita!?
Gun X Clover
Hageruya!
Hekikai no AiON
Higanbana no Saku Yoru ni
High School DxD
Highschool of the Dead (on hiatus)
Hisone to Masotan
Iinari! Aibure-shon
Isekai Tenseisha Goroshi -Cheat Slayer-
Itsuka Tenma no Kuro Usagi
Kamen no Maid Guy
Kanon
Karin
Kaze no Stigma
Kiyoshirō Denki File
Kōkaku no Regiosu
Konosuba
Kore wa Zombie Desu ka?
Kyoshiro and the Eternal Sky
Lemon ni Vitamin C wa Sorehodo Fukumareteinai
Lolita Complex Phoenix (aka Lolicon Phoenix) (created by Satoru Matsubayashi, who also authored Haijin-sama no End Contents in Young Ace.)
Maburaho
Maken-ki! (continued here after the cancelation of Dragon Age Pure)
Marianas Densetsu
Mei no Naisho
Mizore no Kyōshitsu
Mizuiro Splash
Namara! My Love
Nodoka Nobody
Omamori Himari
Ore Fetish: Ichigo-chan Ki o Tsukete
Orufiina Saga
Otaku no Musume-san
Pixy Gale
Precarious Woman Executive Miss Black General
Reimondo
Rocket Knights
Rune Factory 2
Saikin, Imōto no Yōsu ga Chotto Okaishiin Da Ga.
Sasami: Mahou Shoujo Club
Satōgashi no Dangan wa Uchinukenai
Scrapped Princess
Seitokai no Ichizon
Shinigami to Chocolate Parfait
Slayers Evolution-R
Slayers Revolution
So, I Can't Play H!
Sōkō no Strain
Someday's Dreamers
Sunday Without God
Supa Supa
Tai-Madō Gakuen 35 Shiken Shōtai
Tenchi Muyo!
Tengoku kara Miteita Umi
Tetsunagi Kooni
The Third
Trapped in a Dating Sim: The World of Otome Games is Tough for Mobs
Triage X (ongoing)
Trinity Seven (ongoing)
Tsubame Shindorōmu
Tsuiteru Kanojo
Unlimited Wings 
Variante
Yaeka no Karte
Yami ni Koishita Hitsuji-chan
Zero In

References

External links
 
 

2003 establishments in Japan
Fujimi Shobo
Monthly manga magazines published in Japan
Magazines established in 2003
Shōnen manga magazines